The 1923–24 PCHA season was the 13th and last season of the professional men's ice hockey Pacific Coast Hockey Association league. Season play ran from November 26, 1923, until February 25, 1924. Each team played 30 games, including eight games against Western Canada Hockey League (WCHL) teams. The Seattle Metropolitans club would be regular-season PCHA champions, but lost the play-off against the Vancouver Maroons 2-2, 1-2.

League business
The league approved a rule limiting goalkeeper pads to 12" in width. The league also banned goalkeepers from going behind their own net.

Regular season

Final standings
Note: W = Wins, L = Losses, T = Ties, GF= Goals For, GA = Goals against
Teams that qualified for the playoffs are highlighted in bold

Standings include results of games played against WCHL opponents.

Playoffs

The Maroons won the two-game total-goals series against Seattle 2-2, 2-1 (4-3).

The Maroons then played against the Western Canada Hockey League champion Calgary for the right to go directly to the Stanley Cup Final. Calgary would win the series 1-3, 5-3, 3-1. Vancouver then played Montreal in a semi-final and lost a two-game series 2-3, 1-2 (3-5).

Schedule and results

Source: Coleman(1966)

Player statistics

Goaltending averages

Scoring leaders

See also
 Pacific Coast Hockey Association
 1923–24 NHL season
 1923–24 WCHL season

References

Notes

Bibliography

 
Pacific Coast Hockey Association seasons
2
PCHA